Schreiteria is the scientific name of two genera of organisms and may refer to:

Schreiteria (beetle), a genus of insects in the family Cerambycidae
Schreiteria (plant), a genus of plants in the family Montiaceae